Mike Saofaiga Foai (born 12 January 1991) is a Samoan footballer who plays as a forward for the Samoa national football team and Kiwi FC.

Saofaiga was born in Vaiala. He played for Vailima Kiwi FC in the 2016 OFC Champions League.

He was selected for the Samoa national football team for the 2016 OFC Nations Cup. In June 2019 he was named to the squad for the 2019 Pacific Games.

References 

Living people
1991 births
People from Tuamasaga
Samoan footballers
Samoa international footballers
Kiwi FC players
Association football forwards
2012 OFC Nations Cup players
2016 OFC Nations Cup players